Synochoneura dentana is a species of moth of the family Tortricidae. It is found in Guizhou, China.

References

	

Moths described in 2007
Archipini